Mohamed Fouzair (born 24 December 1991) is a Moroccan footballer who plays as a midfielder for Al-Raed. 

He was called up for the first time by Hervy Renard the international game against Mali on 1 September 2017 for the World Cup qualification game in Rabat.

Career statistics

Honours
FUS Rabat
Champion  2015–16 Botola
Semifinal 2016 CAF Confederation Cup
Runner up  coupe du trone 2015
Semifinal 2016–17 Arab Club Championship
Champion  Coupe du Trone 2014
Semifinal  2017 CAF Confederation Cup

Individual
Arab Club Championship competition top scorer: 2016–17

References

http://mountakhab.net/www/modules/fiches_joueurs/fiche.php?id=232693

1991 births
Living people
Moroccan footballers
Footballers from Casablanca
Association football midfielders
Fath Union Sport players
Ittihad Tanger players
Botola players
Expatriate footballers in Saudi Arabia
Al Nassr FC players
Ohod Club players
Al-Raed FC players
Saudi Professional League players
Moroccan expatriate sportspeople in Saudi Arabia